Ivana Popovic (born 19 September 2000) is an Australian tennis player.

Popovic has a highest singles ranking by the Women's Tennis Association (WTA) of 354, achieved on 10 August 2020. She also has a career-high WTA doubles ranking of 250, set on 15 November 2021.

Popovic made her WTA Tour main draw debut at the 2021 Gippsland Trophy, where she received a wildcard into the doubles main draw, partnering Abbie Myers.

Her brother Milislav Popovic is a professional footballer.

ITF Circuit finals

Doubles: 2 (1 title, 1 runner-up)

References

External links
 
 
 Ivana Popovic at Tennis Australia

2000 births
Living people
Australian female tennis players
Tennis players from Sydney
Australian people of Serbian descent
21st-century Australian women